Himeno (written: 姫野) is a Japanese surname. Notable people with the surname include:

, Japanese writer
, Japanese rugby union player
, Japanese animator and character designer
, Japanese footballer

Japanese-language surnames